Little 8th Route Army (Chinese: 小八路) is a stop motion Chinese animated puppet film.  It is also referred to as "Little 8th Route Heroes" and "Small 8th Route Army".

Background
The film was produced and released under the term of chairman Mao Zedong when the cultural revolution was still ongoing.  The plot backdrop is based on the National Revolutionary Army's 8th Route Army division, when it was under the control of Communist Party of China instead of the opposing Kuomintang.  Despite numerous movie adaptations, this is the only animation piece ever produced on the subject.  A story book was also released as a companion to the film.

Story
The story takes place during the Second Sino-Japanese War.  The Imperial Japanese Army enters a village in northern China where young Huzi is involved in the anti-Japanese movement.  His sister is captured as part of the village sweep.   Huzi seeks revenge and is rescued by an 8th Route Army chief named Yang.  Afterwards, Huzi and the party restore the grain supplies and go on the offensive against the Japanese forces.  Eventually Huzi himself is admitted to the 8th Route division.

Adaptations
The first documentary on the subject was the 1938.  The first movie to come before this puppetry animation was the 1961 "Little Heroes".  Two movies were also made in 1978 "Two Young 8th Route Army Soldiers" and "We are the 8th Route Army Men".

References

External links
 The film at China's Movie Database

1973 films
Chinese animated films
Puppet films
1970s Mandarin-language films
Chinese propaganda films
Maoist China propaganda films